Eupogonius tomentosus is a species of beetle in the family Cerambycidae. It was described by Haldeman in 1847. The species has not yet been ranked by conservation status.

E tomentosus is not an invasive species and lives in Canada and the US, with the exception of Hawaii and Alaska.

References

Eupogonius
Beetles described in 1847